Villas de Granada is a neighbourhood (barrio) located in the locality of Engativá in Bogotá, Colombia. It is located northwest of the city, bordering the neighborhoods of Garcés Navas, Ciudadela Colsubsidio and El Cortijo.

References

Neighbourhoods of Bogotá